Żołędowo may refer to the following places:
Żołędowo, Kuyavian-Pomeranian Voivodeship (north-central Poland)
Żołędowo, Masovian Voivodeship (east-central Poland)
Żołędowo, West Pomeranian Voivodeship (north-west Poland)